Prijezda II (Born 1242) was a Bosnian Ban in 1287–1290 alone, but later together with his possible brother Stephen I Kotroman as a vassal of the Hungarian Kingdom.

He was one of the sons of Ban Prijezda I. After his father's withdrawal from power in 1287, he split Bosnia with his brother, Stephen I Kotroman, taking control over western Bosnia. He died in 1290 and his lands were transferred to his brother Kotroman, who became the sole ruler of Bosnia proper.

See also 
 List of Bosnian rulers
 House of Kotromanić
 History of Bosnia and Herzegovina
 List of Bosnians

References
Medieval Lands: BOSNIA, BANS of BOSNIA (KOTROMANIĆ) 1290-1463 - Foundation for Medieval Genealogy

Bans of Bosnia
1290 deaths
Year of birth unknown
Kotromanić dynasty
13th-century Bosnian people
1242 births
People of the Banate of Bosnia